KABI-LD, virtual channel 42 (UHF digital channel 32), is a low powered Heroes & Icons-affiliated television station licensed to Snyder, Texas, United States. The station is owned by Gray Television, making it a sister to Gray's duopoly of Lubbock-licensed NBC affiliate KCBD (channel 11) and Wolfforth-licensed CW affiliate KLCW-TV (channel 23); it is also sister to three other low-power stations—MyNetworkTV affiliate KMYL-LD (channel 14, which is simulcast on KLCW's second digital subchannel), Class A Telemundo affiliate KXTQ-CD (channel 46), and MeTV affiliate KLBB-LD (channel 48). Gray also operates Fox affiliate KJTV-TV (channel 34) and low-power Class A independent KJTV-CD (channel 32) through a shared services agreement (SSA) with owner SagamoreHill Broadcasting. KABI-LD, KLCW-TV, KMYL-LD, KJTV-TV, KLBB-LD, KXTQ-CD and KJTV-CD share studios at 98th Street and University Avenue in south Lubbock. KABI-LD's transmitter is located north of Snyder.

As KABI-LD's transmitter is located in Snyder, its broadcast radius does not reach the major city in the market. Therefore, in order to reach the city, the station shares its subchannels with KLBB-LD's second and third subchannels respectively. However, KLBB's signal does not reach over the entire market as the station is also low-powered, so it must rely on cable and satellite to reach the entire market.

Digital channels
The station's signal is multiplexed:

References

External links

Movies! affiliates
Television stations in Lubbock, Texas
Television channels and stations established in 1996
Low-power television stations in the United States
Heroes & Icons affiliates
Gray Television
1996 establishments in Texas